Baldrey  may refer to:

Long John Baldrey, English-Canadian blues singer and voice actor
Joshua Baldrey, engraver and draftsman